FTE may refer to:

Economics
 Flow-through entity, a corporate legal entity where income flows, untaxed, to investors
 Flows to equity, a method of corporate valuation
 Full-time equivalent, the total hours contracted to a group of employees, divided by the hours worked by a full-time employee

Government and non-profit organisations
 Florida's Turnpike Enterprise, an agency of the state government of Florida, United States
 Foundation for Teaching Economics, an American educational organization
 Foundation For Technical Education, a Swiss educational organization
 Foundation for Thought and Ethics, an American intelligent design organization
 Foundation of Technical Education, an Iraqi administrative organization

Science and technology
 Failure to eject, when a firearm fails to eject a shell, casing or cartridge
 Fault Tolerant Ethernet, a form of Ethernet LAN
 Flight test engineer, a support role in aircraft flight testing
 Flux transfer event, in which high-energy solar particles flow through the Earth's magnetosphere
 Format-transforming encryption, a form of cryptography

Transportation
 Comandante Armando Tola International Airport in El Calafate, Argentina
 Ford Tickford Experience, an Australian automotive marque
 FTE automotive, a German automotive manufacturing company